Chevroderma is a genus of molluscs belonging to the family Prochaetodermatidae.

The species of this genus are found in Atlantic Ocean.

Species:

Chevroderma cuspidatum 
Chevroderma gauson 
Chevroderma hadalis 
Chevroderma javanicum 
Chevroderma lusae 
Chevroderma paradoxum 
Chevroderma scalpellum 
Chevroderma turnerae 
Chevroderma vityazi 
Chevroderma whitlatchi

References

Molluscs